Rattlesdene v Grunestone (YB 10 Edw II (54 SS) 140) is a 1317 case in English law.

Facts
The plaintiff claimed that the defendant had sold him a bottle of wine but, before delivery, drew off much of the wine and replaced it with salt water.

Commentary
The academics Mark Lunney and Ken Oliphant argue that in reality the case was likely the result of a shipping accident with the facts fabricated to allow the court to circumvent the vi et armis requirements which required that loss be suffered 'with force and arms' if a claim was to be brought.

See also
Trespass on the case

References

English tort law
English contract law
1317 in England